Natan Grigoryevich Rakhlin (Russian: Натан Григорьевич Рахлин, Ukrainian: Натан Григорович Рахлін;  − June 28, 1979) was a Soviet conductor.

Biography
Rakhlin was born January 10, 1906 in Snovsk, Gorodnyansky Uyezd, Chernigov Governorate, Russian Empire.

Rakhlin served as Artistic Director of the Ukrainian SSR State Symphony Orchestra from 1937 to 1962 and was the musical director of a number of Soviet films. In 1941 he succeeded Alexander Gauk as director of the USSR State Symphony Orchestra. On October 30, 1957, Rakhlin conducted the premiere of Dmitri Shostakovich's Symphony No. 11.

Rakhlin was the founder of the Tatar ASSR State Symphony Orchestra, which he led from its foundation in 1966 until his death in 1979.

Discography
 N. Rimsky-Korsakov, P. Tchaikovsky, V. Kalinnikov - Russian Conductors Vol. 12 - Nathan Rakhlin by Pyotr Tchaikovsky, Vasily Kalinnikov, Nikolai Rimsky-Korsakov, Nathan Rakhlin, and Moscow Philharmonic Symphony Orchestra Bolshoi Theatre Orchestra (audio CD - 2008)
 Glazunov: Symphony No. 4 (conducted by Natan Rakhlin), Cortège Solonel, Poeme Lyrique (conducted by Gennady Roshdestvensky), Moscow Radio Symphony Orchestra. HMV-Melodiya ASD 3238 (LP no longer available).

References

External links 
 

Ukrainian conductors (music)
Male conductors (music)
Jewish classical musicians
1906 births
1979 deaths
20th-century conductors (music)
Academic staff of Kazan Conservatory
20th-century male musicians